Riudellots de la Selva is a municipality in the comarca of the Selva in Catalonia, Spain. It is situated in the basin of the Onyar river, on the A-7 autopista and the main N-II road, and is served by a RENFE railway station on the line between Barcelona and Girona and the GE-672 road and is close to the aeroport of Girona.

The Gothic church of Sant Esteve dates from the 16th century.

References

 Panareda Clopés, Josep Maria; Rios Calvet, Jaume; Rabella Vives, Josep Maria (1989). Guia de Catalunya, Barcelona: Caixa de Catalunya.  (Spanish).  (Catalan).

External links 
Official website 
 Government data pages 

Municipalities in Selva
Populated places in Selva